In much of the Organisation internationale de la Francophonie, including former colonies of France, same-sex sexual activity is not considered a criminal offense. This is due, in part, to the lack of existing anti-homosexuality laws at the time of French rule. However, in most of the member states, including those states in which same-sex sexual activity is not criminalized, social taboos against it remain. In a small minority of member states, same-sex couples are allowed the ability to register civil unions or marriages.

Protections by Member State

Note: † Signed UN General Assembly declaration in favour of LGBT rights. ‡ Signed alternative Statement against LGBT rights.

See also
LGBT rights in the Commonwealth of Nations

References

LGBT rights by region
Organisation internationale de la Francophonie